Mount Delaney is a rural locality in the Moreton Bay Region, Queensland, Australia. In the  Mount Delaney had a population of 85 people.

Geography 

The west of the locality of Mount Delaney rises in elevation along the D'Aguilar Range.  In this area is a section of the D'Aguilar National Park, Mount Mee State Forest and the summit of Mount Delaney.  Delaneys Creek winds across the locality from east to west towards Nuerum Creek and feeding into the Stanley River catchment and Somerset Dam.  Nuerum Creeks forms part of the western boundary.

History 
The mountain and the locality which takes its name were named after a pioneer called Delaney, either a selector or a gold prospector.

Mount Delaney State School opened on 1 June 1933 and closed on 7 August 1936.

At the  Mount Delaney  had a population of 59 people.

In the  Mount Delaney had a population of 85 people.

Education
There are no schools in Mount Delaney. The nearest primary schools are Delaneys Creek State School in neighbouring Delaneys Creek to the east, Mount Mee State School in neighbouring Mount Mee to the south-east, and Woodford State School in Woodford to the north-east. The nearest secondary schools are Woodford State School (to Year 10) in Woodford and Kilcoy State High School (to Year 12) in Kilcoy to the north-west.

References

Suburbs of Moreton Bay Region
Localities in Queensland